Streeter may refer to:

 Streeter, North Dakota, American city
Streeter, West Virginia, American city
Streeters Corners, New York, an unincorporated hamlet
 Streeter (surname)
Streeter-Phelps equation, a water-modeling tool

See also
Streeterville, a waterfront neighborhood in Chicago, Illinois
Streeter Place, a residential building in Streeterville
 Streator, Illinois